Bryce Low Crawford Jr. (November 27, 1914 – September 16, 2011) was an American scientist. He worked for decades as a professor of physical chemistry in the University of Minnesota.

Awards and honors
Crawford has been a member of the National Academy of Sciences since 1956. He was elected in 1962 a Fellow of the American Physical Society, a member of the American Philosophical Society in 1971, and a member of the American Academy of Arts and Sciences in 1977. Among his awards are the Priestley Medal in 1982.

References

External links 

American physical chemists
1914 births
2011 deaths
Members of the United States National Academy of Sciences
Fellows of the American Physical Society
Stanford University alumni
University of Minnesota faculty

Members of the American Philosophical Society